Eetch (otherwise known as eech, itch, metch or one of several other variations) is a traditional Armenian side dish, salad or spread, similar to tabbouleh.  Eetch can be eaten either at room temperature or warm.

Its typical red colour is derived from crushed or pureed tomatoes. Common additional ingredients include onion, parsley, olive oil, lemon, paprika, and bell peppers.

Eetch is colloquially known as mock kheyma due to its characteristics as a vegetarian form of kheyma.

See also
Kısır

References

External links
Eech, Armenian side dish

Bibliography 
 The Cuisine of Armenia. Sonia Uvezian, (2001) 
 The Armenian Cookbook 
 Cuisine of Armenia; Sonia Uvezian 
 Complete Armenia Cookbook; Vezjian; 

Armenian cuisine
Lenten foods
Meat substitutes